Jock Cameron may refer to:

Jock Cameron (1905–1935), South African cricketer
Jock Cameron (footballer), Scottish international soccer player

See also
Jack Cameron (disambiguation), several people
John Cameron (disambiguation), several people